Ockendon railway station is located on a passing loop on a single-track branch of the London, Tilbury and Southend line, serving the town of South Ockendon, Essex. Its three-letter station code is OCK.

The station was opened in 1892 by the London, Tilbury and Southend Railway (LTSR). Today, all passenger train services are operated by c2c, which also manages the station. Although the station is outside the London fare zones 1 to 6, it became part of the Oyster card pay-as-you-go network in 2010.

History
By the late 20th century, service on the line had been reduced to a relatively infrequent shuttle between Upminster and Grays.

Services
The station has two platforms.

Connections
Local buses 11, 12, 269 and London Buses route 347 serve the station.

References

External links

Railway stations in Essex
Transport in Thurrock
Former London, Tilbury and Southend Railway stations
Railway stations in Great Britain opened in 1892
Railway stations served by c2c
South Ockendon